Knights Prairie Township is one of twelve townships in Hamilton County, Illinois, USA.  As of the 2010 census, its population was 574 and it contained 261 housing units.

Geography

Demographics

School districts
 Hamilton County Community Unit School District 10

Political districts
 Illinois's 19th congressional district
 State House District 108
 State Senate District 54

References
 
 United States Census Bureau 2009 TIGER/Line Shapefiles
 United States National Atlas

External links
 City-Data.com
 Illinois State Archives
 Township Officials of Illinois
 Hamilton County Historical Society

Townships in Hamilton County, Illinois
Mount Vernon, Illinois micropolitan area
Townships in Illinois
1885 establishments in Illinois